Nipponnemertes is a genus of worms belonging to the family Cratenemertidae.

The genus has cosmopolitan distribution.

Species:

Nipponnemertes africanus 
Nipponnemertes arenaria 
Nipponnemertes bimaculata 
Nipponnemertes danae 
Nipponnemertes drepanophoroides 
Nipponnemertes fernaldi 
Nipponnemertes incainca 
Nipponnemertes madagascarensis 
Nipponnemertes magnus 
Nipponnemertes marioni 
Nipponnemertes occidentalis 
Nipponnemertes ogumai 
Nipponnemertes pacificus 
Nipponnemertes pulcher 
Nipponnemertes pulchra 
Nipponnemertes punctatula 
Nipponnemertes rubella 
Nipponnemertes sanguinea 
Nipponnemertes schollaerti 
Nipponnemertes variabilis

References

Nemerteans